Bruce William Devlin (born 10 October 1937) is an Australian professional golfer, sportscaster and golf course designer.

Devlin was born in Armidale, Australia. He turned pro in 1961 and joined the PGA Tour in 1962 after an amateur career in Australia which included a win at the Australian Amateur in 1959. During his PGA Tour career, he had eight victories all of which occurred between 1964 and 1972. In 1972, he earned $119,768 and finished eighth on the money list.

On the Senior PGA Tour, Devlin won one tournament, the 1995 FHP Health Care Classic. At the end of the 1998 golf season, Devlin decided to retire from the Senior PGA Tour to concentrate on his Golf Course Architecture and Design business and his commitment to ESPN's golf telecasts.

The main focus of Devlin's career in the past 30 years has been his work as a Golf Course Architect and Designer. Devlin has designed and built more than 150 golf courses throughout the world including Australia, Japan, Scotland, the Bahamas, and the United States. About two-thirds of the golf courses he designed have been in Florida and Texas. Many of these courses have hosted all of the professional golf tours, including: The Houston Open, HealthSouth LPGA Classic, Key Biscayne Golf Classic, and The Nike Cleveland Open. His golf design business is based in Scottsdale, Arizona.

Devlin has also worked as a television commentator. He worked for NBC from 1977 to 1982; ESPN from 1983 to 1987; and since 1999 has occasionally covered professional golf for ESPN.

At the 72nd hole of the 1975 Andy Williams-San Diego Open Invitational, Devlin shot a 10 after hitting multiple shots into the water in front of the 18th green of the Torrey Pines South Course. The pond was thereafter nicknamed "Devlin’s Billabong".

Devlin is one of only four golfers to have scored a double eagle (three-under-par) at the Masters Tournament. He achieved this in the first round of the 1967 Masters, holing a 4-wood from 248 yards on the par-5 8th hole.

Amateur wins
this list may be incomplete
1958 Lake Macquarie Amateur, New South Wales Amateur
1959 Australian Amateur

Professional wins (31)

PGA Tour wins (8)

PGA Tour playoff record (0–3)

PGA Tour of Australasia wins (1)

*Note: The 1983 Air New Zealand Shell Open was shortened to 54 holes due to rain.

Australia/New Zealand circuit wins (19)
1959 Victorian Close Championship (as an amateur)
1960 Australian Open (as an amateur)
1962 Wills Classic, Victorian Open
1963 New Zealand Open, Queensland Open, Victorian Open, Adelaide Advertiser Tournament (tie with Frank Phillips), Wills Classic, Caltex Tournament
1964 Victorian PGA Championship
1965 Wills Masters, Dunlop International
1967 Lakes Open
1968 Dunlop International
1969 Australian PGA Championship, Dunlop International, City of Sydney Open
1970 Australian PGA Championship

Other wins (3)
1963 French Open
1970 Alcan Golfer of the Year Championship, World Cup (team with David Graham)

Senior PGA Tour wins (1)

*Note: The 1995 FHP Health Care Classic was shortened to 36 holes due to rain.

Senior PGA Tour playoff record (1–0)

Results in major championships

WD = withdrew
CUT = missed the half-way cut
"T" indicates a tie for a place

Summary

Most consecutive cuts made – 18 (1968 Masters – 1972 Open Championship)
Longest streak of top-10s – 3 (twice)

Team appearances
these lists may be incomplete

Amateur
Eisenhower Trophy (representing Australia): 1958 (team winners and individual leader, tie), 1960
Commonwealth Tournament (representing Australia): 1959
Australian Men's Interstate Teams Matches (representing New South Wales): 1957 (winners), 1958 (winners), 1959 (winners), 1960 (winners)

Professional
World Cup (representing Australia): 1963, 1964, 1966, 1970 (winners), 1971

References

External links

Australian male golfers
PGA Tour golfers
PGA Tour Champions golfers
Golf course architects
Golf writers and broadcasters
People from Armidale
Sportsmen from New South Wales
1937 births
Living people